Nicolaus Carpenia (1619–1670) was a Roman Catholic prelate who served as Archbishop of Durrës (1657–1670).

Biography
Nicolaus Carpenia was born in Durres in 1619.
On 27 August 1657, he was appointed during the papacy of Pope Paul V as Archbishop of Durrës.
On 16 September 1657, he was consecrated bishop by Pietro Vito Ottoboni, Bishop of Brescia, with Gregorio Giovanni Gasparo Barbarigo, Bishop of Bergamo, and Cristofor Segni, Titular Archbishop of Thessalonica, serving as co-consecrators. 
He served as Archbishop of Durrës  until his death on 20 May 1670.

References 

17th-century Albanian Roman Catholic bishops
Bishops appointed by Pope Paul V
1619 births
1670 deaths